San Diego Studio is an American video game developer based in Sorrento Valley, San Diego. A first-party studio for Sony Interactive Entertainment, it is responsible for MLB: The Show games. The studio also developed the NBA series, The Mark of Kri, Pain, High Velocity Bowling, and Sports Champions.

History 
San Diego Studio was founded through a merger of Red Zone Interactive and 989 Sports. Red Zone Interactive, a San Diego-based development studio, was founded in December 1997 by former employees of Sony Interactive Studios America (SISA), the sole in-house studio of the Sony Computer Entertainment America (SCEA) between 1995 and 1998. SISA was later renamed 989 Studios before being merged into SCEA in February 2000, with the "989" label being retained as a brand name. Red Zone Interactive's NFL GameDay series was among the games published under the "989 Sports" label. SCEA acquired Red Zone Interactive in January 2001, including its 65 employees led by president Chris Whaley. San Diego Studio was formally founded in 2001.

Games developed

References

External links 
 

2001 establishments in California
American companies established in 2001
Companies based in San Diego
First-party video game developers
PlayStation Studios
Video game companies based in California
Video game companies established in 2001
Video game development companies